Nocardioides pyridinolyticus is a pyridine-degrading bacterium from the genus Nocardioides.

References

Further reading

External links
Type strain of Nocardioides pyridinolyticus at BacDive -  the Bacterial Diversity Metadatabase	

pyridinolyticus
Bacteria described in 1997